Luminiţa Talpoş (born 9 October 1972 in Craiova, Dolj) is a female long-distance runner from Romania, who specialized in the marathon race during her career.

Career
Talpoș set her personal best (2:26:43) in the women's marathon at the Vienna City Marathon on 27 April 2008.

Achievements

References

1972 births
Living people
Romanian female long-distance runners
Romanian female marathon runners
Athletes (track and field) at the 2008 Summer Olympics
Olympic athletes of Romania
Sportspeople from Craiova